The 1993–94 Serie A was won by Milan, being the 14th title for the rossoneri and their third in succession, complemented by glory in the UEFA Champions League. It was a disappointing season in the league for Internazionale, whose 13th-place finish saw them avoid relegation by a single point, but they compensated for this by winning the UEFA Cup. Piacenza, Udinese, Atalanta and Lecce were all relegated. Milan won the Scudetto during the penultimate match again Udinese.

This was the final season in which two points were awarded for a win; going forward this changed to three points.

Teams
Reggiana, Cremonese, Piacenza and Lecce had been promoted from Serie B. Milan won the title scoring just 36 goals from 34 games all season; they didn't score more than 2 goals in any single game throughout the season.

Number of teams by region

Personnel and Sponsoring

League table

Results

Top goalscorers

References and sources

Almanacco Illustrato del Calcio - La Storia 1898-2004, Panini Edizioni, Modena, September 2005

External links
  - All results on RSSSF Website.

Serie A seasons
Italy
1993–94 in Italian football leagues